Ceratozamia vovidesii is a species of cycad in the family Zamiaceae endemic to the Sierra Madre de Chiapas of Mexico.

References

Whitelock, Loran M. 2002. The Cycads. Portland: Timber Press.

External links
 * 

vovidesii
Flora of Mexico